The Aquarium Berlin in Berlin is one of Germany's largest aquariums. The aquarium was built in 1913 as part of the Berlin Zoological Garden complex. Since its opening the Zoo-Aquarium has been ranked among the public aquariums with the world’s greatest biodiversity.

Exhibits

Over 9,000 animals are presented on three storeys. It contains jellyfish, tropical and native fishes, crocodilians (caimans and gharial), and a broad variety of insects. In addition to its 250 tanks for fish, the aquarium houses a wide variety of amphibians and reptiles including tuataras.

The shark tank presents the blacktip reef shark and other species.

The largest of these basins is the  Great Coral Basin with its reproduction lagoon.

References

External links
 
 

Berlin Zoological Garden
Aquaria in Germany
Buildings and structures in Berlin
Tourist attractions in Berlin